Multidrug resistance-associated protein 2 (MRP2) also called canalicular multispecific organic anion transporter 1 (cMOAT) or ATP-binding cassette sub-family C member 2 (ABCC2) is a protein that in humans is encoded by the ABCC2 gene.

Function 

MRP2 is a member of the superfamily of ATP-binding cassette (ABC) transporters. ABC proteins transport various molecules across extra- and intra-cellular membranes. ABC genes are divided into seven distinct subfamilies (ABC1, MDR/TAP, MRP, ALD, OABP, GCN20, White).  More specifically, this protein is a member of the MRP subfamily, which is involved in multi-drug resistance. This protein is expressed in the canalicular (apical) part of the hepatocyte and functions in biliary transport. Substrates include anticancer drugs such as vinblastine; therefore, this protein appears to contribute to drug resistance in mammalian cells.

MRP2 is also expressed in the apical membrane of proximal renal tubule endothelial cells where they are involved in the excretion of small organic anions.

MRP2 inhibitors

Clinical significance

Dubin–Johnson syndrome 

Several different mutations in this gene have been observed in patients with Dubin–Johnson syndrome (DJS), an autosomal recessive disorder characterized by conjugated hyperbilirubinemia.

Iatrogenic Fanconi syndrome 

Many negatively charged metabolic waste products are eliminated from the body by the kidneys.  These organic anions are transported from the blood into the endothelial cells of the renal proximal tubules by the OAT1 transporter.  From there, these waste molecules are transported into the lumen of the tubule by the MRP2 transporter.  Many drugs are eliminated from the body by this mechanism.  Some of these drugs pass through the MRP2 transporter slowly.  This may cause a buildup of organic anions in the cytoplasm of the cells.

Drugs that inhibit the MRP2 transporter can cause a buildup of organic anions inside renal proximal tubule cells.  If some of these organic anions inhibit mitochondrial DNA synthesis, it may cause iatrogenic Fanconi syndrome. The nucleoside phosphonate adefovir is a MRP2 inhibitor that has been linked to kidney disease. Tenofovir and cidofovir are also nucleoside phosphonates that inhibit MRP2 and have been associated with Fanconi syndrome.

Interactive pathway map

See also
 ATP-binding cassette transporter

References

Further reading

External links 
 

ATP-binding cassette transporters